The 1993 Boston Red Sox season was the 93rd season in the franchise's Major League Baseball history. The Red Sox finished fifth in the American League East with a record of 80 wins and 82 losses, 15 games behind the Toronto Blue Jays, who went on to win the 1993 World Series.

Offseason
 December 1, 1992: Scott Fletcher (baseball) was signed as a free agent by the Red Sox.
 December 8, 1992: Scott Bankhead was signed as a free agent by the Red Sox.
 December 9, 1992: Andre Dawson was signed as a free agent by the Red Sox.
 December 9, 1992: Phil Plantier was traded by the Boston Red Sox to the San Diego Padres for Jose Melendez.
 January 18, 1993: Tony Fossas was signed as a free agent by the Red Sox.
 March 1, 1993: Jeff Russell was signed as a free agent by the Red Sox.

Spring training
In a spring training game on April 2, 1993, Frank Viola and Cory Bailey combined on a no-hitter as the Red Sox defeated the Philadelphia Phillies, 10–0, at Jack Russell Memorial Stadium in Clearwater, Florida.

Regular season

Season standings

Record vs. opponents

Notable transactions
 April 3, 1993: Ernest Riles was signed as a free agent by the Red Sox.
 May 7, 1993: Steve Lyons was signed as a free agent by the Red Sox.
 June 3, 1993: Trot Nixon was drafted by the Red Sox in the 1st round of the 1993 MLB draft.  Player signed August 31, 1993.
 June 3, 1993: Jeff Suppan was drafted by the Red Sox in the 2nd round of the 1993 MLB draft.  Player signed June 29, 1993.
 June 3, 1993: Lou Merloni was drafted by the Red Sox in the 10th round of the 1993 MLB draft.  Player signed June 5, 1993.
 August 17, 1993: Iván Calderón was released by the Red Sox.

Opening Day lineup

Source:

Alumni game
On May 29, the Red Sox held an old-timers game, themed to honor Negro league legends; it was held before a scheduled home game with the Texas Rangers. Hitting instructor Mike Easler drove in both runs for the Red Sox alumni team in a 2–2 tie; other participants included César Cedeño, Jim Lonborg, and Roy White.

Roster

Player stats

Batting

Starters by position
Note: Pos = Position; G = Games played; AB = At bats; H = Hits; Avg. = Batting average; HR = Home runs; RBI = Runs batted in

Other batters
Note: G = Games played; AB = At bats; H = Hits; Avg. = Batting average; HR = Home runs; RBI = Runs batted in

Pitching

Starting pitching
Note: G = Games pitched; IP = Innings pitched; W = Wins; L = Losses; ERA = Earned run average; SO = Strikeouts

Relief and other pitchers 
Note: G = Games pitched; IP = Innings pitched; W = Wins; L = Losses; ERA = Earned run average; SV = Saves

Awards and honors 
 Danny Darwin – AL Pitcher of the Month (May)

All-Star Game
 Scott Cooper, reserve 3B

Farm system

The Fort Lauderdale Red Sox replaced the Winter Haven Red Sox as a Class A-Advanced affiliate. The Utica Blue Sox replaced the Elmira Pioneers as the Red Sox' Class A-Short Season affiliate.

Source:

Game Log

References

External links
1993 Boston Red Sox team page at Baseball Reference
1993 Boston Red Sox season at baseball-almanac.com

Boston Red Sox seasons
Boston Red Sox
Boston Red Sox
Red Sox